Yuta Murakoshi is a Japanese kickboxer, fighting out of Tokyo, Japan. He is the former K-1 Featherweight and RISE Bantamweight champion.

As of November 2021, he is the #5 ranked bantamweight in the world according to Combat Press. He was ranked in the strawweight top ten by Combat Press between May 2019 and February 2020, and in the bantamweight top ten between July 2018 and November 2018.

Kickboxing career

RISE
Murakoshi made his professional debut in April 2011, against Singdam M16muaythaistyle as part of the 2011 Rising Rookies Cup. He lost the fight by KO in the third round.

After this loss, Murakoshi went on a five fight winning streak, scoring KO wins over Yunbo, Yuji and Hironori Okama, as well as decision wins over Hirofumi Kamata and Daihachi Furuoka.

His winning streak was snapped by an extra round split decision loss to Seiya Rokugawa during RISE 91.

After this loss, Murakoshi once again went on a five fight winning streak. He scored decision wins over Hikaru Fujihashi and Tomoya Aoki, and KO wins over Tomo Arimatsu, Kazuki Tanaka and Shuto Miyazaki.

Murakoshi's five fight winning streak earned him a chance to challenge Hiroki Maeda for the RISE Bantamweight title. Murakoshi won the fight by unanimous decision.

After winning the RISE Bantamweight title, Murakoshi fought three non-title bouts. During RISE 101, he defeated Takashi Oono by unanimous decision. During RISE 102, he defeated Nakalek Kaew.Kanraya by a second round KO. During RISE 104, he defeated So Jeon Hu by a second round KO.

Murakoshi was scheduled to defend his RISE Bantamweight title for the first time against the sixteen year old Tenshin Nasukawa. Nasukawa won the fight by TKO, midway through the second round.

BLADE FC
Yuta Murakoshi took part in the 2015 BLADE FC 55 kg tournament. In the quarterfinals, Murakoshi faced Yu Wor.Wanchai, and won the bout by unanimous decision. In the semifinals he fought Taiki Naito, but would in turn lose a unanimous decision.

Return to RISE
Returning to RISE, Murakoshi went on a three fight winning streak. He won a split decision against Itto, and scored (T)KO wins over Tomo Arimatsu and Eisaku Ogasawara.

Murakoshi fought a rematch with Tenshin Nasukawa for the RISE Bantamweight title in September 2016. Nasukawa won the fight by majority decision.

After his failed title bid, Murakoshi won his next four fights. He first won a unanimous decision against Norihisa Isencho during J-NETWORK 20th Anniversary～2nd. He then won a majority decision against Masahide Kudo during RISE 118. Afterwards, Murakoshi fought Shunta during Big Bang's ISEHARA event, and won the fight by unanimous decision. The last win of this four fight winning streak came against Ryusei Ashizawa, whome he defeated by majority decision.

K-1
Murakoshi fought Haruma Saikyo for the Krush Featherweight title, during Krush 86. Saikyo successfully defended his title by an extra round decision.

Yuta Murakoshi participated in the 2018 K-1 Featherweight World Grand Prix. He defeated Elias Mahmoudi by an extra round split decision in the quarterfinals. He again went into an extra round against Jorge Varela in the semifinals, after which Murakoshi won a unanimous decision. In the tournament finals, he fought a rematch with Haruma Saikyo, whom he defeated by TKO, after Saikyo suffered an ankle injury in the first round.

After winning the K-1 Featherweight title, Murakoshi lost a decision to Alex Rivas, in November 2018.

He was scheduled to defend his K-1 Featherweight title against Hirotaka Urabe at K'Festa 2. Murakoshi won the fight by unanimous decision.

In his next two fights, Murakoshi won a unanimous decision against Huo Xiaolong, and lost a majority decision to Takeru Segawa. In December 2020, he won a unanimous decision against Naoki Yamamoto. Murakoshi fought Ryusei Ashizawa at the K-1: K'Festa 4 Day 1 event, and won the fight by unanimous decision.

Murakoshi faced Narufumi Nishimoto at K-1 World GP 2021: Yokohamatsuri on September 20, 2021. He won the fight by unanimous decision.

Murakoshi was scheduled to face Hirotaka Asahisa at K-1: K'Festa 5 on April 3, 2022. He lost the fight by knockout in the first round.

Titles and accomplishments

Kickboxing
RISE
 2012 RISE Rookies Cup Bantamweight Winner
 2014 RISE Bantamweight Champion

K-1
 2018 K-1 World GP -57.5kg Champion (One defense)

Karate
2006 Byakuren Kaikan All Japan Jr Championship U-12 runner-up

Fight record

|- style="background:#fbb" 
| 2022-04-03 || Loss||align=left| Hirotaka Asahisa || K-1: K'Festa 5 || Tokyo, Japan ||KO (Jumping knee) || 1 ||1:42
|-  style="background:#cfc;"
| 2021-09-20 || Win ||align=left| Narufumi Nishimoto || K-1 World GP 2021: Yokohamatsuri || Yokohama, Japan || Decision (Unanimous) || 3 || 3:00
|-  style="background:#cfc;"
| 2021-03-21|| Win || align=left| Ryusei Ashizawa || K-1: K'Festa 4 Day 1 || Tokyo, Japan || Decision (Unanimous) || 3||3:00
|-  style="background:#cfc;"
| 2020-12-13|| Win || align=left| Naoki Yamamoto || K-1 World GP 2020 Winter's Crucial Bout|| Tokyo, Japan || Decision (Unanimous) || 3 || 3:00
|-  style="background:#fbb;"
| 2020-03-22|| Loss ||align=left| Leona Pettas || K-1: K’Festa 3 || Saitama, Japan || TKO (Punches)|| 3|| 2:33
|-  style="background:#FFBBBB;"
| 2019-11-24 || Loss|| align=left| Takeru||  K-1 World GP 2019 Yokohamatsuri  || Yokohama, Japan || Decision (Majority)|| 3 || 3:00
|-  style="background:#CCFFCC;"
| 2019-06-30|| Win ||align=left| Huo Xiaolong || K-1 World GP 2019: Super Bantamweight World Tournament || Saitama, Japan || Decision (Unanimous) || 3 || 3:00
|-  style="background:#CCFFCC;"
| 2019-03-10|| Win ||align=left| Hirotaka Urabe ||K-1 World GP 2019: K’FESTA 2 || Saitama, Japan || Decision (Unanimous)|| 3 || 3:00
|-
! style=background:white colspan=9 |
|-
|-  style="background:#FFBBBB;"
| 2018-11-03|| Loss ||align=left| Alex Rivas ||  K-1 World GP 2018: 3rd Super Lightweight Championship Tournament || Saitama, Japan || Decision (Unanimous) || 3 || 3:00
|-
|-  style="background:#CCFFCC;"
| 2018-06-17|| Win ||align=left| Haruma Saikyo || K-1 World GP 2018: 2nd Featherweight Championship Tournament, Final || Tokyo, Japan || TKO (ankle injury) || 1 || 0:51
|-
! style=background:white colspan=9 |
|-
|-  style="background:#CCFFCC;"
| 2018-06-17|| Win ||align=left| Jorge Varela || K-1 World GP 2018: 2nd Featherweight Championship Tournament, Semi Final || Tokyo, Japan || Ext.R Decision (Unanimous) || 4 || 3:00
|-
|-  style="background:#CCFFCC;"
| 2018-06-17|| Win ||align=left| Elias Mahmoudi ||K-1 World GP 2018: 2nd Featherweight Championship Tournament, Quarter Final || Tokyo, Japan || Ext.R Decision (Split) || 4 || 3:00
|-
|-  style="background:#FFBBBB;"
| 2018-03-10|| Loss ||align=left| Haruma Saikyo || Krush.86 || Tokyo, Japan || Decision (Split) || 3 || 3:00
|-
! style=background:white colspan=9 |
|-
|-  style="background:#CCFFCC;"
| 2017-12-27|| Win ||align=left| Ryusei Ashizawa || K-1 World GP 2017 Japan Survival Wars 2017 || Tokyo, Japan || Decision (Majority)|| 3 || 3:00
|-
|-  style="background:#CCFFCC;"
| 2017-10-08|| Win ||align=left| Shunta || Big Bang ISEHARA || Kanagawa, Japan || Decision (Unanimous) || 3 || 3:00
|-
|-  style="background:#CCFFCC;"
| 2017-07-17|| Win ||align=left| Masahide Kudo || RISE118 || Tokyo, Japan || Decision (Majority) || 3 || 3:00
|-
|-  style="background:#CCFFCC;"
| 2017-02-25|| Win ||align=left| Norihisa Isencho || J-KICK 2017～J-NETWORK 20th Anniversary～2nd || Tokyo, Japan || Decision (Unanimous) || 3 || 3:00
|-  style="background:#FFBBBB;"
| 2016-09-25|| Loss ||align=left| Tenshin Nasukawa || RISE 113 || Tokyo, Japan || Decision (Majority) || 5 || 3:00
|-
! style=background:white colspan=9 |
|-
|-  style="background:#CCFFCC;"
| 2016-07-30|| Win ||align=left| Eisaku Ogasawara || RISE 112 || Tokyo, Japan || TKO (Corner Stoppage)|| 3 || 1:53
|-  style="background:#CCFFCC;"
| 2016-03-26|| Win ||align=left| Tomo Arimatsu || RISE 110 || Tokyo, Japan || KO (Liver Kick) || 3 || 1:37
|-  style="background:#CCFFCC;"
| 2015-11-08|| Win ||align=left| Itto || RISE 108 || Tokyo, Japan || Ext.R Decision (Split) || 4 || 3:00
|-  style="background:#FFBBBB;"
| 2015-08-01|| Loss ||align=left| Taiki Naito || BLADE Fighting Championship 2 - JAPAN CUP -55kg, Semi Finals || Tokyo, Japan || Decision (Unanimous) || 3 || 3:00
|-  style="background:#CCFFCC;"
| 2015-08-01|| Win ||align=left| Yu Wor.Wanchai || BLADE Fighting Championship 2 - JAPAN CUP -55kg, Quarter Finals || Tokyo, Japan || Decision (Unanimous) || 3 || 3:00
|-  style="background:#FFBBBB;"
| 2015-09-31|| Loss ||align=left| Tenshin Nasukawa || RISE 105 || Tokyo, Japan || TKO (Punches)|| 2 || 1:31
|-
! style=background:white colspan=9 |
|-
|-  style="background:#CCFFCC;"
| 2015-03-21|| Win ||align=left| So Jeon Hu || RISE 104 || Tokyo, Japan || KO (Left Knee to the Body)|| 2 || 1:46
|-
|-  style="background:#CCFFCC;"
| 2014-11-06|| Win ||align=left| Nakalek Kaew.Kanraya || RISE 102 || Tokyo, Japan || KO (Left Hook) || 2 || 0:32
|-
|-  style="background:#CCFFCC;"
| 2014-09-28|| Win ||align=left| Takashi Oono || RISE 101  || Tokyo, Japan || Decision (Unanimous) || 3 || 3:00
|-
|-  style="background:#CCFFCC;"
| 2014-07-12|| Win ||align=left| Hiroki Maeda || RISE 100～BLADE 0～ || Tokyo, Japan || Decision (Unanimous)|| 5 || 3:00
|-
! style=background:white colspan=9 |
|-
|-  style="background:#CCFFCC;"
| 2014-03-30|| Win ||align=left| Shuto Miyazaki || RISE 98 || Tokyo, Japan || Ext.R KO (Right Knee)|| 4 || 0:23
|-  style="background:#CCFFCC;"
| 2013-11-04|| Win ||align=left| Kazuki Tanaka || RISE 96 || Tokyo, Japan || KO (Front Kick)|| 2 || 1:00
|-
|-  style="background:#CCFFCC;"
| 2013-09-13|| Win ||align=left| Tomo Arimatsu || RISE 95 || Tokyo, Japan || KO (Knee)|| 2 || 1:10
|-  style="background:#CCFFCC;"
| 2013-07-20|| Win ||align=left| Tomoya Aoki || RISE 94 || Tokyo, Japan || Decision (Unanimous) || 3 || 3:00
|-
|-  style="background:#CCFFCC;"
| 2013-06-09|| Win ||align=left| Hikaru Fujihashi || RISE 93 || Tokyo, Japan || Decision (Unanimous)|| 3 || 3:00
|-  style="background:#FFBBBB;"
| 2013-01-06|| Loss ||align=left| Seiya Rokugawa || RISE 91/M-1MC ～INFINITY.II～ || Tokyo, Japan || Ext.R Decision (Split) || 4 || 3:00
|-  style="background:#CCFFCC;"
| 2012-10-25|| Win ||align=left| Daihachi Furuoka || RISE 90 || Tokyo, Japan || Decision (Unanimous)|| 3 || 3:00
|-
|-  style="background:#CCFFCC;"
| 2012-06-17|| Win ||align=left| Hironori Okama || J-NETWORK J-KICK 2012～NEXT J-GENERATION～3rd || Tokyo, Japan || KO  || 2|| 2:26
|-  style="background:#CCFFCC;"
| 2012-03-11|| Win ||align=left| Yuji  || RISE ZERO || Tokyo, Japan || KO (Right Hook) || 2 || 0:35
|-  style="background:#CCFFCC;"
| 2011-12-18|| Win ||align=left| Hirofumi Kamata || RISE ZERO || Tokyo, Japan || Decision (Unanimous) || 3 || 3:00
|-  style="background:#CCFFCC;"
| 2011-09-23|| Win ||align=left| Yunbo || RISE 82 || Tokyo, Japan || KO || 1 || 2:08
|-  style="background:#FFBBBB;"
| 2011-04-24|| Loss ||align=left| Singdam M16muaythaistyle|| RISE 77 - Rising Rookies Cup  || Tokyo, Japan || KO (Punches)|| 3 || 2:53
|-
| colspan=9 | Legend:    

|-  style="background:#fbb;"
| 2010-10-31|| Loss||align=left| Shogo Kondo|| KAMINARIMON All Japan Tournament, Quarter Final || Tokyo, Japan || Decision (Unanimous)|| 1 ||2:00

|-  style="background:#fbb;"
| 2010-08-25|| Loss||align=left| Nobuto Ikeda|| K-1 Koshien East Japan Selection Tournament, 1/8 Final || Tokyo, Japan || Ext.R Decision || 2 ||2:00

|-  style="background:#cfc;"
| 2010-08-25|| Win||align=left| Haruki Nihei || K-1 Koshien East Japan Selection Tournament, First Round || Tokyo, Japan || Ext.R Decision || 2 ||2:00

|-  style="background:#fbb;"
| 2009-10-25|| Loss||align=left| Shogo Kondo|| KAMINARIMON Championship Selection Tournament, Semi Final || Tokyo, Japan || Decision (Majority)|| 1 ||2:00

|-  style="background:#cfc;"
| 2009-10-25|| Win||align=left| Kouki Hosogai || KAMINARIMON Championship Tournament, Quarter Final || Tokyo, Japan || Decision (Unanimous)|| 1 ||2:00

|-  style="background:#cfc;"
| 2009-08-23|| Win||align=left| Tokio Yachuda || KAMINARIMON  || Tokyo, Japan || Decision (Majority)|| 2 ||1:30

|-
| colspan=9 | Legend:

See also
List of male kickboxers
List of K-1 champions

References

Living people
1994 births
Japanese male kickboxers
Flyweight kickboxers
People from Hiratsuka, Kanagawa
Sportspeople from Kanagawa Prefecture